The 1968 United States presidential election in Idaho took place on November 5, 1968, as part of the 1968 United States presidential election. State voters chose four representatives, or electors, to the Electoral College, who voted for president and vice president.

Idaho was won by former Vice President Richard Nixon (R–California), with 56.79% of the popular vote, against former Senator and incumbent Vice President Hubert Humphrey (D–Minnesota), with 30.66% of the popular vote. American Independent Party candidate George Wallace performed quite well, finishing with 12.55% of the popular vote.

With 56.79% of the popular vote, Idaho would prove to be Nixon's second strongest state in the 1968 election after Nebraska.

Results

Results by county

See also
 United States presidential elections in Idaho

Notes

References

Idaho
1968
1968 Idaho elections